Taiwan government plans to build 6.5 GW solar power stations before 2020 and a total of  20 GW by 2025.

Here is a table showing the growth of solar power capacity and generation in Taiwan since 2000.

Statistics 
Taiwan's installed solar power capacity and generation in recent years is shown in the table below:

See also 
 Solar power
 Photovoltaics
 Growth of photovoltaics
 Energy in Taiwan
 Renewable energy in Taiwan

References 

Taiwan
Solar power in Taiwan